Radoslavci is a settlement in the Municipality of Ljutomer in northeastern Slovenia. The area belongs to the traditional region of Styria and is now included in the Mura Statistical Region.

The local chapel in the southern part of the settlement was built in the late 19th century.

References

External links
Radoslavci on Geopedia

Populated places in the Municipality of Ljutomer